Bishreltiin Khorloodoi (born 29 May 1998) is a Mongolian judoka. She is the bronze medallist in the -52 kg at the 2021 Judo Grand Slam Paris

At the 2021 Judo Grand Slam Abu Dhabi held in Abu Dhabi, United Arab Emirates, she won one of the bronze medals in her event.

References

External links
 

Mongolian female judoka
1998 births
Living people
21st-century Mongolian women